Ubakochikami Dam is an earthfill dam located in Yamaguchi prefecture in Japan. The dam is used for irrigation. The catchment area of the dam is 0.3 km2. The dam impounds about   ha of land when full and can store 12 thousand cubic meters of water. The construction of the dam was completed in 1918.

References

Dams in Yamaguchi Prefecture
1918 establishments in Japan